Bruno Candrian (born 21 May 1947) is a Swiss equestrian. He competed at the 1976 Summer Olympics and the 1984 Summer Olympics.

References

1947 births
Living people
Swiss male equestrians
Olympic equestrians of Switzerland
Equestrians at the 1976 Summer Olympics
Equestrians at the 1984 Summer Olympics
Place of birth missing (living people)
20th-century Swiss people